D' Kilabots Pogi Brothers Weh?! is a 2012 Filipino romantic comedy film directed by Soxie M. Topacio. The film stars Jose Manalo, Wally Bayola, Solenn Heussaff, Pokwang, Paolo Ballesteros and Gina Pareño. It was made after Jose Manalo and Wally Bayola hit it big with a sold-out concert.

Synopsis
Two brothers become rivals in the affections of the same woman. Their rivalry tears them apart, and causes one of them to be heartbroken. But the two are forced to reunite in order to protect their family from a greedy businessman.

Cast

Main cast
 Jose Manalo as Justine Kilabot
 Wally Bayola as Bruno Kilabot
 Pokwang as Kitty Kilabot
 Solenn Heussaff as Lulu
 Paolo Ballesteros as Tweety

Supporting cast
 Gina Pareño as Sophia Kilabot
 Jimmy Santos as Jai-ho
 Mosang as J-Lo
 Diego	Llorico as Ngengio	
 Tirso Cruz III as Donald Trang
 Michael de Mesa as Mr. Lucio

Special Participation
 Allan K. as Security Guard
 Maricel Soriano as Female Partner
 Roderick Paulate as Male Partner
 Vic Sotto as Bossing Chairman
 German Moreno† as Kuya Hermano
 Victor Basa as Police Officer
 Michael V. as MMDA Traffic Enforcer
 Aljur Abrenica as Police Officer
 Eddie Garcia† as Police Superintendent
 Niña Jose as Justine's suitor
 Nyoy Volante as Guitarist
 Janica Pareño as Donald's maid

Reception

Critical response

Philbert Ortiz Dy of ClickTheCity.com rated the film 1.5 out of 5. He stated, "The end credits of D'Kilabots Pogi Brothers, Weh? share space with little vignettes of the two lead actors thanking the various guest stars of the movie for showing up. Many of these stars end up making the same joke: that they aren’t getting paid. These vignettes sum up the problem with the movie as a whole. For one thing, much of the movie seems to have been designed around these cameo appearance. And secondly, the movie has a tendency to repeat its humor. These problems are compounded by an odd production that can’t seem to decide what the name of one of the characters is."

Rating
It was graded "PG-13" by the Cinema Evaluation Board of the Philippines.

Trivia
 The main characters are derived from name of artists, singer, song, politicians, businessmen and toys
 This is also second movie of Jose Manalo and Wally Bayola under APT Entertainment and M-Zet TV Production Inc. after the success of their first movie Scaregivers (2008)
 The movie features actors and actresses from all 3 networks: GMA Network, ABS-CBN and TV5

References

External links
 

2010s Tagalog-language films
Philippine romantic comedy films
APT Entertainment films
M-Zet Productions films